Viktor Tölgyesi (born 18 January 1992) is a Hungarian football player who plays for Dunaújváros.

References 
Profile at HLSZ 

1992 births
Living people
People from Kecskemét
Hungarian footballers
Hungary youth international footballers
Hungary under-21 international footballers
Association football midfielders
Kecskeméti TE players
Gyirmót FC Győr players
Békéscsaba 1912 Előre footballers
FC Ajka players
Tiszakécske FC footballers
Pécsi MFC players
Dunaújváros PASE players
Nemzeti Bajnokság I players
Nemzeti Bajnokság II players
Nemzeti Bajnokság III players
Sportspeople from Bács-Kiskun County
21st-century Hungarian people